Thijssen, Thijsen and Thijsse are Dutch patronymic surnames. The common Dutch given name Thijs is a short form of Mathijs (=Matthew). Thijssen is particularly common in the Dutch provinces of North Brabant and Limburg.  People with this surname include:

Thijssen
 (born 1961), Dutch painter and glass artist
Felix Thijssen (born 1933), Dutch novelist
François Thijssen (died 1638), Dutch explorer of the south coast of Australia
Frans Thijssen (born 1952), Dutch footballer
Gerben Thijssen (born 1998), Belgian racing cyclist
Henny Thijssen (born 1952), Dutch singer and music producer
 (born 1975), Dutch draughts player
Leon Thijssen (born 1968), Dutch show jumper
Lynn Thijssen (born 1992), Dutch volleyball player
Maerten Thijssen (died 1657), Dutch admiral who later became a Swedish nobleman
Nicole Thijssen (born 1988), Dutch tennis player
Theo Thijssen (1879–1943), Dutch writer, teacher and socialist politician
Walter Thijssen (1877–1943), Dutch rower
Thijsen
Cornelius Didrikson Thijsen Anckarstierna (1655–1714), Swedish admiral and noble born as Cornelis Thijsen
Thijsse
Jac. P. Thijsse (1865–1945), Dutch conservationist and botanist

See also
Thyssen

Dutch-language surnames
Patronymic surnames
Surnames from given names